The fourth season of So You Think You Can Dance, the Dutch-Belgian dance competition based on the format of the American show by the same name, premiered in fall of 2011.  Dan Karaty, Euvgenia Parakhina, Jan Kooijman, and Marco Gerrits all returned as judges marking the first time in the series' history that the judging panel remained unchanged. An Lemmens and Dennis Weening returned to co-host for a third season.

On November 27, classical ballet dancer Nina Plantefève-Castryck was announced winner and received €25,000, a choice of dance training opportunities in the U.S. and a solo in a David Guetta music video.

Selection Process

Auditions
In season 4 open auditions were held in more than two locations (the Royal Theatre Carré in Amsterdam and the Vooruit), which was a first. Over two thousand dancers registered to take part in this phase of the competition.

Bootcamp 
The first phase of the Bootcamp for the 2011 season was held in Tilburg with 100 dancers chosen from the open auditions attending. After the first day of workshops half of these dancers had been cut. Following the second day of workshops, the judges chose six dancers they felt had already earned a place in the next phase and required the remaining dancers to perform solos to earn one of the remaining 18 spots in the foreign-locale portion of the Bootcamp (held in Havana, Cuba) for season 4. On account of the location, Dan Karaty was unable to participate in the finale selection process for the Top 18 since he is American and the U.S. trade embargo on Cuba prevents him from visiting or working in the country. After several more workshop rounds, primarily centered on the Latin styles indigenous to Cuba, the remaining three judges chose the season's Top 18 dancers.

Live Shows

Top 18

Male Contestants

Female Contestants

Elimination Chart

Performance

Live Show 1 (October 9, 2011)

Results Show 1
Group Choreography: Top 18: "Heartbeat"—Nneka (Contemporary Hip Hop; Choreography: Roy Julen)
Dance For Your Life solos:

Live Show 2 (October 16, 2011)

Results Show 2
Group Choreography: Top 16: "Save The World"—Swedish House Mafia (Hip Hop; Choreography: Roy Julen)
Dance For Your Life solos:

Live Show 3 (October 23, 2011)

Results Show 3
Group Choreography: Top 14: "Without You"—David Guetta feat. Usher (Hip Hop; Choreography: Roy Julen)
Dance For Your Life solos:

Live Show 4 (October 30, 2011)

Results Show 4
Group Choreography: Top 12: "Carmina Burana"—Carl Orff (Hip Hop; Choreography: Vincent Vianen)
Dance For Your Life solos:

Live Show 5 (November 6, 2011)

Results Show 5
Group Choreography: Top 10: "The Alphabeat"—David Guetta (Hip-hop Choreography: Roy Julen)
Dance For Your Life solos:

Live Show 6 (November 13, 2011)

Results Show 6
Group Choreography: Top 8: "Set fire to the rain" - Adele Choreography: Roy Julen
Dance For Your Life solos:

Live Show 7 (November 20, 2011)

Results Show 7
Group Choreography: Top 6: "Swagger Jagger"—Cher Lloyd (Hip Hop Choreography: Roy Julen)
Eliminated
 Celine de Raedemaeker
 Juvat Westendorp

Finale (November 27, 2011) 
Group Choreography: Eliminated dancers: "Skinny Love"—Birdy (live) (Modern; Choreography: Roy Julen)

Results Show Finale
Group Choreography: Top 18: "Scars"—Basement Jaxx (Hip-hop; Choreography: Roy Julen)
Eliminated
Anthony Benjamin
Solos:

Battle:

Runner-up
Anna-Alicia Sklias
Winner:
Nina Plantefève-Castryck

Theater Tour

Tour Dates

External links 
 , vtm (Belgium)
 , RTL (Netherlands)

References

Season 04